Parvacreadium is a genus of trematodes in the family Opecoelidae. It consists of one species, Parvacreadium bifidum Manter, 1940.

References

Opecoelidae
Plagiorchiida genera
Monotypic protostome genera